David John Bena (born December 10, 1943) is an American Anglican bishop.

He was Suffragan Bishop of the Episcopal Diocese of Albany from 2000 to 2007. He subsequently joined the Convocation of Anglicans in North America, in March 2007, a missionary body of the Church of Nigeria in the United States and Canada, that would be a founding body of the Anglican Church in North America, in 2009. He served as Suffragan Bishop of CANA, assisting Missionary Bishop Martyn Minns in CANA's church-growing until his retirement in 2011. He came out of retirement to be interim rector of St. Margaret's Anglican Church in Woodbridge, Virginia. Bishop Bena now serves as Assistant Bishop of the ACNA Diocese of CANA East.

See also 
List of bishops of the Anglican Church in North America

References

External links 
David Bena Biography at CANA Official Website 

Living people
Bishops of the Anglican Church in North America
1943 births
Episcopal bishops of Albany
21st-century American clergy
Anglican realignment people